The following highways are numbered 471:

Canada
Manitoba Provincial Road 471

Israel
Highway 471 (Israel)

Japan
 Japan National Route 471

United States 
  Interstate 471
  Arkansas Highway 471
  Florida State Road 471
  Kentucky Route 471
  Louisiana Highway 471
  Maryland Route 471
  Mississippi Highway 471
  North Carolina Highway 471
  Pennsylvania Route 471
  Puerto Rico Highway 471
  South Dakota Highway 471
 Texas:
  Texas State Highway Loop 471
  Texas State Highway Spur 471
  Farm to Market Road 471